Tiendas Topeka (or Topeka Stores) is a large Puerto Rican retail department store chain.

Topeka as a store chain began in the late 1950s, competing with such other stores as Woolworth's, Pitusa (which opened in 1977) and La New York Department Stores. 

Topeka grew into one of the largest retail store chains on the island by opening locations in almost every town and city in Puerto Rico. Puerto Rico's shopping mall boom of the 1980s provided Topeka with further opportunity to open in more locations.

Originally a clothing store, Topeka gradually grew to include food, school items, electronics, toys and other consumer products in their stores.

Topeka has now opened a few supermarkets and Hipermercados (a combination food and clothing store) under their trademark name in Puerto Rico.

References

Puerto Rican brands
Retail companies of Puerto Rico